Dolichocodia is a genus of bristle flies in the family Tachinidae. There are at least three described species in Dolichocodia.

Species
Dolichocodia bivittata (Coquillett, 1902)
Dolichocodia erratilis Reinhard, 1958
Dolichocodia furacis Reinhard, 1958

References

Dexiinae
Diptera of North America
Tachinidae genera
Taxa named by Charles Henry Tyler Townsend